The 1912 Colorado Mines Orediggers football team was an American football team that represented the Colorado School of Mines in the Rocky Mountain Conference (RMC) during the 1912 college football season. The team compiled a 9–1 record and was champion of the RMC.

Schedule

References

Colorado Mines
Colorado Mines Orediggers football seasons
Rocky Mountain Athletic Conference football champion seasons
Colorado Mines Orediggers football